Hasina Dacait is a Hindi action drama movie of Bollywood directed and produced by Rajesh Mittal. This film was released on 2 February 2001 under the banner of R.N. Films.

Plot
This is a revenge story of an innocent girl who becomes a dreaded lady dacoit due to social injustice. Being rejected by her in-laws as well as her own brother, she tries to kill herself but is saved. Thereafter, she takes arms in hand and becomes a lady Robin Hood for poor the villagers.

Cast
 Raza Murad as Thakur
 Goga Kapoor
 Rakesh Pandey as Police commissioner
 Shiva Rindani
 Rani Sinha as Basanti
 Ali Khan as Shakti Sing
 Ramesh Goyal
 Birbal
 Madhuri Mishra
 Rohit Raj
 K.K. Sharma

References

External links
 

2000 films
2000s Hindi-language films
2001 action drama films
2001 films
Indian action drama films
Indian rape and revenge films
Films about outlaws
Indian films about revenge
2000 drama films